Sutera griquensis is a species of plant from South Africa.

Description 
It is glandular and covered in fine, down-like hairs. The oval-shaped leaves are typically alternately arranged, although they may sometimes be oppositely arranged. The stalk is often nearly as long as the blade. The bases are not connate. The margins are coarsely toothed and the larger teeth may themselves be sparingly toothed.

While the flowering season has proven difficult to determine precisely, it seems to flower after it has rained. The flowers have white or rarely mauve corolla lobes and a yellow or orange tube. Inflorescences may be solitary or held in tree flowered cymules in the upper axils. They are arranged in loose panicles or in racemes. The calyx is bilabiate. The corlolla tube is cylindrical, broasening very slightly towrds the top.

Distribution and habitat 
This species is endemic to South Africa and is known from the Northern Cape, North West and Free State provinces. It is best known from the Griqualand West area. It prefers growing in the shelter provided by cliffs and rocky outcrops.

Conservation 
This species is classified as being of least concern.

References 

Flora of South Africa
Plants described in 1904
Scrophulariaceae